Artemisa is a Cuban town and capital of Artemisa Province.

Artemisa may also refer to:

 Artemisa Formation, a geologic formation in Cuba
 Artemisa Province, a Cuban province
 FC Artemisa, a Cuban football club

See also
Artemisia (disambiguation)
Artemesia (disambiguation)
Artemis (disambiguation)